Sheikh Sibi (born 21 February 1998) is a Gambian professional footballer who plays as a goalkeeper for Italian  club Virtus Verona and the Gambia national team.

Early life
Sibi was born in Serekunda to a Gambian mother and a Mauritanian father. He left Gambia at the age of 16 with the hope of migrating to Europe. During the journey, he crossed the Sahara desert and reached Tripoli, where he worked as a painter for five months. In July 2015, he crossed the Mediterranean Sea in a boat and reached the Italian island of Lampedusa.

Club career
Following his arrival in Italy, Sibi was assigned to Costagrande Reception Center in Verona. He soon moved to Virtus Vita, a non-profit organization which welcomes migrants. Since Virtus Vita and Virtus Verona were owned by the same company Vencomp, it helped Sibi to continue his football career.

Sibi made his club debut for Virtus Verona on 30 October 2016 in a 2–1 Serie D defeat to Union Feltre. He made his Serie C and professional debut on 16 September 2018 in a 2–0 defeat to Fermana.

International career
Sibi has received several call-ups to the Gambia national team since June 2019. He made his international debut on 29 March 2021 in a 1–0 defeat to DR Congo.
He played in the 2021 Africa cup of Nations, his national team's first continental tournament, where they made a sensational quarter-final.

Career statistics

International

References

External links
 

1998 births
Living people
People from Serekunda
Gambian people of Mauritanian descent
Gambian footballers
Association football goalkeepers
Serie D players
Serie C players
Virtus Verona players
2021 Africa Cup of Nations players
Gambian expatriate footballers
Gambian expatriate sportspeople in Italy
Expatriate footballers in Italy
The Gambia international footballers